Diana Coloma (born c. 1993) is an Ecuadorian politician. She was a model until she lost her sight. She has been a beauty queen and she was elected as a councillor.

Life

Coloma was born in Santo Domingo and she became a beauty queen and a model. She was studying for a degree in law when she was 19. She was involved in a car accident that left her blind. She was depressed and tried to take her own life.

She became an activist in Santo Domingo de los Tsáchilas. She attracted attention taking a three day walk to Quito to draw attention to her demands.

In 2017 her party, National Democratic Center, put her forward to be a member of the National Assembly as second on their list of candidates. She was not elected.

When she was 26 she was elected to be a Santo Domingo council member. She was the first politician there with sight disibilities and she had to have an assistant to help her to get to her office on the second storey. She saw the difficulties as a challenge and proof that change was required. She campaigns to create a university in her city and to improve accessibility.She noted that the existing laws needed to be made to be enforcable.

In 2022 improvements were made to her city's bus service as a subsidy was introduced that prevented a planned rise in ticket prices. Coloma was noted saying that the bus company needed to improve signage and to introduce traffic lights that made a sound for those with sight problems.

Private life
Coloma is married and they had a child about 2019.

References

External links
Majestad TV
video

1990s births
Living people
Year of birth uncertain
Ecuadorian women in politics